Maria Alexandrovna Kondratieva (born 17 January 1982) is a retired Russian tennis player.

Kondratieva, who started playing tennis aged seven and turned professional in 1999, has a career-high singles ranking of world No. 210, achieved on 23 June 2008. On 18 October 2010, she peaked at No. 48 in the WTA doubles rankings. Kondratieva won one doubles title on the WTA Tour, as well as four singles and 20 doubles titles on the ITF Women's Circuit.

She and her partner Vladimíra Uhlířová beat Marina Erakovic and Anna Chakvetadze in the final of the 2010 Banka Koper Slovenia Open. This was Kondratieva's only time to win a WTA Tour doubles title in her career. In 2016, Kondratieva announced her retirement from professional tennis.

WTA career finals

Doubles: 4 (1 title, 3 runner-ups)

ITF finals

Singles (4–7)

Doubles (20–12)

References

External links
 
 

1982 births
Living people
Russian female tennis players
Tennis players from Moscow